Dai Smith may refer to:

Dai Smith (rugby league) (fl. 1900s), Welsh rugby league player
Dai Smith (academic) (born 1945), Welsh academic and former Chair of the Arts Council of Wales